The PWS-5 or PWS-5t2, was a multi-seated Polish liaison aircraft, developed in 1928 by PWS (Podlaska Wytwórnia Samolotów - "Podlasie Aircraft Factory").

Design and development

In 1927, the Aviation Department of the Polish War Ministry opened a contest for a liaison and observation plane capable of operating from unprepared airfields, in cooperation with land Army units. In the PWS factory, Aleksander Grzędzielewski and Augustyn Bobek-Zdaniewski proposed a plane, designated initially PWS-7, the first prototype of which was flown on 28 December 1928 at Biała Podlaska by Franciszek Rutkowski, with the designation changing to PWS-5 in 1929.

An interesting feature was the interchangeable upper and mainplanes which resulted in the upper wings being shorter than the lower, due to the lack of a centre-section between the upper planes. In February 1929 a second improved prototype, with a shorter forward fuselage and larger tail surfaces, designated PWS-5a was flown, which, in spite of being heavier than planned, empty weight  versus , that affected performance, the War Ministry considered the design satisfactory, with good handling and stability, ordering a short series of 5 aircraft which were designated PWS.5t2 by the factory in a similar fashion to the French Air Ministry ("t" standing for towarzyszący - army co-operation and 2 being the crew size).

However, a detailed evaluation in the Aviation Technical Research Institute (ITBL) showed, that the 'PWS.5t2' had a long take-off run, poor handling in the glide at slow speed and low ceiling due to the use of an inadequate Wright propeller. Other competitors: the PZL Ł.2 and Lublin R-X were evaluated, with better results, so no more PWS-5s were ordered.

Construction
The rectangular wooden wings had two-spars, covered with canvas and plywood, with the Upper and lower wings connected by N-shaped inter-plane struts and staggered forward. The crew of two, sat in tandem open cockpits, the pilot having a windshield, and the observer sat in a  higher cockpit with glazed upper sides, and a  Lewis machine gun on a ring mounting. The undercarriage consisted of a fixed split axle conventional landing gear, with a rear skid. All fuel was carried in a  fuel tank mounted in the fuselage, forward of the pilot's cockpit.

Operational history
Single PWS-5s were evaluated in different Lotnictwo Wojskowe (Military Aviation) units: Air Regiments nos. 2, 4 and 6 and in the Aviation Training Center at Dęblin and the Air Escadre of the River Flotilla at Pińsk, after which they were used for secondary tasks, such as target-towing.

Variants
PWS-7
The original designation of the first prototype, changed early in 1929, with the revision of the PWS  designation system, to PWS-5.
PWS-5
The designation of the two prototypes after the PWS  designation revision. Two built.
PWS-5t2
Production aircraft delivered to the Lotnictwo Wojskowe (Military Aviation), for trials and operational evaluation. Five built.
PWS 6
A progressive development of the PWS-5 fitted with Handley Page automatic leading-edge slats, higher aspect ratio wings, full-span flaperons on the lower wing (upper wing ailerons removed). The fuselage was faired to a circular section and the engine enclosed in a Townend ring. One built.

Specification (PWS-5t2)

See also

Notes

References

External links

Photos and drawing at Ugolok Neba

1920s Polish military utility aircraft
PWS-05
Biplanes
Single-engined tractor aircraft
Aircraft first flown in 1928